Beaufour is a surname. Notable people with the surname include:

Anne Beaufour (born 1963), French billionaire heiress
Henri Beaufour (born 1965), French billionaire heir and businessman

See also 
Beaufour-Druval, a commune in France

French-language surnames